Tara Elizabeth Zahra (born August 3, 1976) is an American academic who is a Livingston Professor of East European History at the University of Chicago.

She graduated from Swarthmore College and from the University of Michigan with a PhD. She has concentrated her studies on sociohistorical models and archival research on family, nation, and ethnicity in the twentieth century leading to an integrative approach across national borders. 
A MacArthur Fellowship was awarded in 2014.  In 2017, she was elected to the American Academy of Arts and Sciences.

Other awards
2009 Czechoslovak Studies Association Prize
2009 Barbara Jelavich Book Prize
2009 Hans Rosenberg Book Prize
2011 Laura Shannon Prize, Kidnapped Souls
2012 Radomír Luža Prize
2012 George Louis Beer Prize, The Lost Children
 2014 MacArthur Fellowship

Publications

Zahra, Tara and Leora Auslander, eds. (2018), Objects of War: The Material Culture of Conflict and Displacement. Cornell University Press, 2018. .

References

External links
"An Interview with Tara Zahra", Chicago Journal of History, Spring 2015

Living people
University of Chicago faculty
MacArthur Fellows
Swarthmore College alumni
University of Michigan alumni
American women historians
21st-century American women writers
21st-century American historians
1976 births
Fellows of the American Academy of Arts and Sciences